The teams competing in Group 8 of the 2015 UEFA European Under-21 Championships qualifying competition were Israel, Portugal, Norway, Macedonia and Azerbaijan.

The ten group winners and the four best second-placed teams advanced to the play-offs.

Standings

Results and fixtures
All times are CEST (UTC+02:00) during summer and CET (UTC+01:00) during winter.

Goalscorers
 8 goals
  Mu'nas Dabbur

 4 goals
  Ofir Mizrahi

 3 goals

  Tuğrul Erat
  Dor Micha
  Mushaga Bakenga
  Ivan Cavaleiro
  Ricardo Pereira
  Bernardo Silva

 2 goals

  Abdulla Abatsiyev
  Rahman Hajiyev
  Ağabala Ramazanov
  Dia Saba
  Darko Velkovski
  Etzaz Hussain
  William Carvalho
  Ricardo Esgaio
  Rafa Silva

 1 goal

  Amir Agayov
  Shoval Gozlan
  Gil Itzhak
  Taleb Tawatha
  Boban Nikolov
  Tauljant Sulejmanov
  Valon Berisha
  Alexander Groven
  Håvard Nielsen
  Ohi Omoijuanfo
  Elbasan Rashani
  Betinho
  Bruma
  Edgar Ié
  Carlos Mané
  Sérgio Oliveira
  Tiago Ilori

 1 own goal

  Amir Ben-Shimon (against Norway)
  Taleb Tawatha (against Portugal)
  Thomas Grøgaard (against Israel)

Notes

References

External links
Standings and fixtures at UEFA.com

Group 8